Myki is the ticketing system for public transport in Victoria, Australia.

Myki may also refer to:

Places 

Myki, Greece, a municipality in Xanthi regional unit, Western Thrace, Greece
Myki, Poland, a village in Warmian-Masurian Voivodeship, Poland

Other uses 

Myki (password manager), a password manager developed by Myki Inc.

See also 

Miki (disambiguation)
Mikki, a given name
Mykki, 2016 studio album by Mykki Blanco
Mykie, American YouTuber and make-up artist